Orders Are Orders may refer to:
 Orders Are Orders (1955 film), a British comedy film, based on the play
 Orders Are Orders (play), a 1932 comedy play
 Orders Are Orders (1936 film), a German comedy film